Malcolm Williams (July 16, 1870 in Spring Valley, Minnesota – June 10, 1937 in New York, New York) was an American actor and composer.

By February 1896 he had moved to New York City and played Phillip Norwood in Charles Dazey's melodrama The War of Wealth on Broadway at the Star Theatre. The play was inspired by the Panic of 1893. In the 1900 census he was listed as a resident of the Ashland House Hotel on Park Avenue South (4th Ave. then) and 24th St. in New York City.

Family
Malcolm Edgar Williams was the son of John H. and Sarah Williams. Malcolm married actress Florence Reed in February 1908. They often appeared in Broadway shows together and sometimes collaborated writing music. They had no children.

Broadway
 The War of Wealth (1896) as Philip Norwood
 Polly of the Circus (1907) as Rev. John Douglass
 Madame X (1910) as Laroque
 Master of the House as Frederick Hoffman
 The Typhoon
 The Painted Woman (1913) 
 The Phantom Rival (1914) 
 Idol of the Stage (1916)
 Roads of Destiny (1918) as Alec Harvey
 The Mirage (1920) as Henry M. Galt
 The Wisdom Tooth (1926) as Mr. Porter
 Beyond the Horizon (1926) as James Mayo
 The Breaks (1928) as Manson
 Little Accident (1928) as J.J. Overbeck

Selected filmography
 The Brute (1914) as Donald Rogers
 The Dancing Girl as a Quaker
 Idol of the Stage (1916) as Philip Van Kortland
 Down East (1917)
 Empty Pockets (1918)
 The Saphead (1920) (producer)
 Lightnin' (1925) (writer)
 The First Kiss (1928)

Musical compositions
 "I Love My Dolly Best" (1898)
 "Kiss Me Good-Night, Dear"  feature song in 1903 comedy play Merely Mary Ann collaborated with Israel Zangwill

References

External links
 
 
 
 blogspot - Florence Reed
 Poster for 1896 play "The War of Wealth" 
portraits of Malcolm Williams(NY Public Library, Billy Rose Collection)

1870 births
1937 deaths
Male actors from Minnesota
American male stage actors
20th-century American male actors
Male actors from New York City
People from Spring Valley, Minnesota